Michael Newth "Nicky" Downs (born January 8, 1996) is an American professional soccer player who plays as a midfielder.

Career

College and amateur
Downs spent four years playing college soccer at Yale University between 2015 and 2018, scoring 9 goals and tallying 15 assists in 65 appearances. While at Yale, he was a three-time All-Ivy selection, and was named to the United Soccer Coaches All-Northeast Region third team.

Downs played for USL PDL side Black Rock FC in 2018.

Professional
In January 2019, Downs joined USL Championship side Hartford Athletic ahead of their inaugural season.
He was the very first player to sign with the team and was the first Yale alumni to sign with a US based professional soccer team since Ryan Raybould signed with the Kansas city Wizards in 2005.

On April 2, 2021, Downs signed with USL Championship side Loudoun United. On July 24, 2021 Downs scored his first professional goal.

References

External links
USL bio
Yale bio

Living people
1996 births
American soccer players
Association football midfielders
Yale Bulldogs men's soccer players
Hartford Athletic players
Loudoun United FC players
Soccer players from Connecticut
USL League Two players
USL Championship players